Baden-Württembergische Theatertage is a theatre festival in Baden-Württemberg, Germany taking place every two years since 1968.

References

Theatre festivals in Germany